Army Stadium is a multi-purpose stadium in Rawalpindi, Pakistan. It is the home of the Pakistan Army FC. It is also made use by the Pakistan Army for train purposes. The stadium has a capacity of 10,000. 

Football venues in Pakistan
Multi-purpose stadiums in Pakistan
Pakistan Army